Alma Mater Europaea (Latin for "The European nourishing mother", i.e. university) is an international university based in the Austrian city of Salzburg, with campuses in several European cities. It was founded as an initiative by the European Academy of Sciences and Arts, a learned society of around 2100 prominent scientists, including 33 Nobel laureates.

Among the leading scholars, who teach or have given guest lectures at Alma Mater or its events, are Harvard Law School professor Mark Tushnet, Oxford professor Jacob Rowbottom, German political scientist Werner Weidenfeld, who is also the rector of Alma Mater, the Alma Mater president and cardiac surgeon Felix Unger, the Facebook and Instagram Oversight Board member and former European Court of Human Rights vice-president Andras Sajo, David Erdos of Cambridge, the Slovenian Constitutional Court judge Klemen Jaklic, who had lectured at Harvard for seven years before joining Alma Mater, and philosophers Alain Badiou, Jean-Luc Nancy, and Srećko Horvat. Alma Mater faculty has participated at the leading universities' events including those of Harvard, UCLA, and Yale. Their expert opinion appeared in leading media such as The Guardian, The Boston Globe, and Euractiv.

History

Since the early 2000s, the European Academy of Sciences and Arts has been planning the establishment of the university, occasionally with the subtitle of European University for Leadership.

In 2010, Alma Mater Europaea was officially established, with leading Austrian surgeon Felix Unger being appointed as its first president, while the German political scientist Werner Weidenfeld became the first rector, and the Slovenian lawyer, university administrator and diplomat Ludvik Toplak the first prorector.

At a meeting in Munich in February 2011, under the patronage of the presidents of 12 member states of the European Union, the board determined which courses the university would provide. These were to be taught in various cities across the union, in several languages, including English, German, and Spanish. In line with the international nature of the university, students, teachers, and prominent European thinkers would meet at an international symposium at the graduation. It was also decided that Alma Mater Europaea would be incorporated in European and international networks of universities through cooperation agreements. At the meeting it was decided that in the first stage, Alma Mater Europaea would start three 2-year master's degree programs. The university board stated that Alma Mater Europaea would be based on three so-called "W principles": Wissenschaft, Wirtschaft, Wirken. In German, this means: Science, Economy, Effect.

In 2011, the university opened in Slovenia its first campus, located in the Slovenian city of Maribor. This campus enrolled about 500 students in 2011. In July 2011 the university also co-sponsored a summer school in St. Gallen, Switzerland. In the academic year 2012–2013, about 800 students were enrolled in Maribor, the campus in Croatian capital Zagreb was opened, and part of the master's degree studies were carried out in Brussels. In 2013, the Salzburg campus of Alma Mater Europaea was founded and about 1000 students were enrolled in various studies in Austria, Slovenia, and other countries in academic year 2013/14. In 2014, two higher education institutions joined Alma Mater Europaea. The first one is Institutum Studiorum Humanitatis (ISH), internationally renown graduate school of philosophy, with which Slavoj Žižek and numerous other world's leading philosophers had been affiliated. ISH was established in 1992. The other one is the Dance Academy, established in 2008. It is one of the few European institutions issuing government accredited degrees in dance arts. Also in 2014 the studies in Zurich started and in 2015 the Zürich campus was officially established. Ludvik Toplak has served as the president since the university's inception in Slovenia, and Jurij Toplak served as its provost between 2016 and 2022.

Locations and departments

Currently, the university has premises in Salzburg, Ljubljana, Maribor, and Murska Sobota. While administration and offices are mainly in Salzburg and Maribor, lecturing takes place mainly in Ljubljana and Murska Sobota. Lecturing in Salzburg, as well as some other European cities, will start in 2014.

 Department of Physical Therapy
 Department of Nursing
 Department of Social Gerontology
 Department of Management and European Studies
 Department of Archival and Documentology Studies

Programmes
European leadership program, producing future European thinkers; the studies focus in European leadership, culture, political sciences, law, and human rights.
European business studies, producing future European business leaders; This European MBA program would focus on political leadership and strategies, European identity and political culture, transformation and development of Europe, social reforms, sustainable development, globalization.
Theological studies, which would be studied at the newly set-up European Dialogue Center for Theological Studies. A network of dialogue between Catholicism, Orthodoxy, and Islam would be formed with a focus on question "What do the others think differently?"

It's About People conference 
It's About People is an annual week-long multidisciplinary conference organized by the European Academy of Sciences and Arts and the Alma Mater Europaea university. It regularly hosts leaders of national academies of sciences, university rectors, political leaders including EU commissioners, judges of the European Court of Human Rights and highest national courts, and scholars from prominent universities including Harvard, Yale, Oxford, Cambridge, Columbia.

The president of Slovenia has traditionally bestowed the honorary patronage over the event. The conference was opened by the former president Borut Pahor between 2018 and 2022, and in 2023, by president Nataša Pirc Musar. The European Commission vice presidents Maroš Šefčovič and Dubravka Šuica and the European Commissioner Mariya Gabriel have addressed the conference. The eleventh conference, held in 2023, featured over 300 presenters from 30 countries in 80 panels.

See also

Academia Europaea
College of Europe
Global Center for Advanced Studies
European Academy of Sciences and Arts

Citations

External links

Website of the Alma Mater Europaea
Website of the Alma Mater Europaea – European Centre, Maribor

European Academy of Sciences and Arts
Academies of sciences
2010 establishments in Austria
International academies
Educational institutions established in 2010
International universities